Schöftland railway station is a railway station in the municipality of Schöftland, in the Swiss canton of Aargau. It is the western terminus of the  gauge Schöftland–Aarau–Menziken line of Aargau Verkehr.

Services
The following services serve Schöftland:

References

External links 
 

Railway stations in the canton of Aargau
Aargau Verkehr stations